Ceracis is a genus of tree-fungus beetle in the family Ciidae.

Species
These 28 species belong to the genus Ceracis:

 Ceracis californicus (Casey, 1884) i c g b
 Ceracis castaneipennis (Mellié, 1848) g
 Ceracis cucullatus (Mellié, 1849) g
 Ceracis curtus (Mellié, 1848) i c g
 Ceracis dixiensis (Tanner, 1934) i c g
 Ceracis furcifer Mellié, 1849 g
 Ceracis japonus Reitter, 1878
 Ceracis laminicollis Miyatake, 1982 g
 Ceracis laticornis Pic, 1922 g
 Ceracis magister Lawrence, 1971 i c g
 Ceracis minutissimus (Mellié, 1848) i c g
 Ceracis minutus Dury, 1917 i c g
 Ceracis monocerus Lawrence, 1967 i c g
 Ceracis multipunctatus (Mellié, 1848) i c g
 Ceracis nigropunctatus Lawrence, 1967 i c g b
 Ceracis obrieni Lawrence, 1967 i c g
 Ceracis particularis Pic, 1922 g
 Ceracis pecki Lawrence, 1971 i c g
 Ceracis powelli Lawrence, 1967 i c g
 Ceracis pullulus (Casey, 1898) i c g
 Ceracis punctulatus Casey, 1898 i c g
 Ceracis quadricornis Gorham, 1886 i c g
 Ceracis quadridentatus Pic, 1922 g
 Ceracis sallei (Mellié, 1848) i c g
 Ceracis schaefferi Dury, 1917 i c g
 Ceracis shikokuensis Miyatake, 1954
 Ceracis singularis (Dury, 1917) i c g b
 Ceracis thoracicornis (Ziegler, 1845) i c g b

Data sources: i = ITIS, c = Catalogue of Life, g = GBIF, b = Bugguide.net

References

Ciidae genera